is a Japanese animator, scriptwriter, director of anime, and stage director.

Career
A fan of Osamu Tezuka's works, when Yoshikawa was a sophomore in high school, he saw a "Mushi Production's first batch of animators wanted" news article and applied for the job, which led him to enter the anime industry. He was planning to go to art college, but was invited to join Mushi Pro, so he quit high school and joined the company. He participated as an animator for the first Astro Boy series. In 1967, he participated in the founding of Art Fresh with Gisaburō Sugii and Osamu Dezaki. After working as an animator on Mushi Production's Gokū no Daibōken, which Art Fresh participated in, he worked as a freelance animator before becoming a senior director and board member of Dyna-Method Inc. (formerly known as A-UN Entertainment).

In addition to serving as episode director, storyboard artist and writer, he also worked as a director. He has participated in Tensai Bakabon, Star of the Giants, Ashita no Joe, Moomin, Lupin the Third Part I, Invincible Super Man Zambot 3, Invincible Steel Man Daitarn 3, and Future Boy Conan. He is still at the forefront of the animation world.

In addition to anime, he created, wrote and directed Star Guardian with Airship Theater Company, wrote the screenplays for Tanoshii Moomin Ikka and Snow White and the Seven Dwarfs and wrote and directed The Wizard of Oz. It all started when he was asked by director Masaaki Ōsumi to help with the screenplay of Aladdin for Airship Theater Company's Aladdin when he was working on the TV adaptation of Moomin. In addition, he has worked on commercials, events, performances and novels. He has been a fan of science fiction since he read Shōnen Shōjo Sekai Kagaku Bōken Zenshū by Kodansha when he was a kid.

One of the reasons that the 100th episode of the Kirby: Right Back at Ya! anime contained some problems, inconsistencies, and heavy-handedness in the plot and development is that Yoshikawa, who wrote the final episode, learned that his wife was in critical condition at the time and had to rush through the script and leave it in incomplete form in order to be present for her dying moments.

In an interview with Yasuo Ōtsuka for the Lupin III Perfect Book: Complete Collector's Edition, he cites Hayao Miyazaki, Isao Takahata, Osamu Dezaki, and Yoshikawa as representative members of the Japanese anime world.

Works

Director 

 Tomorrow's Joe (ep. 15, 27, 39, 44, 50, 57 and 66)
 The Mystery of Mamo
 Kirby: Right Back at Ya!

Screenwriter 
 series head writer denoted in bold

Television
 Lupin the Third Part I (1971)
 Tensai Bakabon (1971)
 Zero Tester (1973)
 Hoshi no Ko Chobin (1974)
 Gamba no Bouken (1975)
 Time Bokan (1975)
 La Seine no Hoshi (1975)
 The Adventures of Pepero (1975): as Kyodo Oda
 UFO Warrior Dai Apolon (1976)
 Blocker Gundan 4 Machine Blaster (1976)
 Gaiking (1976)
 Paul’s Miraculous Adventure (1976)
 Robot Child Beeton (1976-1977)
 Ore wa Teppei (1977)
 Invincible Super Man Zambot 3 (1977)
 Chogattai Majutsu Robo Ginguiser (1977)
 Invincible Steel Man Daitarn 3 (1978)
 Future Boy Conan (1978)
 Cyborg 009 (1979)
 Marco Polo no Boken (1979)
 The Ultraman (1979-1980)
 Belle and Sebastian (1981)
 Game Center Arashi (1982)
 Combat Mecha Xabungle (1982)
 The Mysterious Cities of Gold (1982)
 Armored Trooper Votoms (1983-1984)
 The Yearling (1983-1985)
 Galactic Patrol Lensman (1984-1985)
 Panzer World Galient (1984-1985)
 Bosco Adventure (1987)
 City Hunter (1987)
 Bit the Cupid (1995)
 Monkey Magic (1999-2000)
 Kirby: Right Back at Ya! (2001-2003)

Movies/OVAs
 Lensman (1984)
 Armored Trooper Votoms: The Last Red Shoulder (1985)
 Armored Trooper Votoms - The Red Shoulder Document: Roots of Ambition (1988)
 Armored Trooper Votoms: Shining Heresy (1994)
 Armored Trooper Votoms: Pailsen Files (2007-2008)

Storyboard 

 Tomorrow's Joe
 Tensai Bakabon
 Moomin
 Ojamajo Doremi Na-i-sho (ep. 7)
 Lupin the Third Part I (ep. 1 and 23)
 The Rose of Versailles
 Ace o Nerae!
 Fang of Sun Dougram
 Armored Trooper Votoms

Animator 

 Astro Boy (1963)

Character design 

 Fang of Sun Dougram

Novel 

 Armored Trooper Votoms The First Red Shoulder
 Armored Trooper Votoms The Last Red Shoulder

References

External links
Dyna-Method Inc. website (archived)

1947 births
Living people
Sunrise (company) people
Anime directors